Ratul Shankar (born Ratul Shankar Ghosh) is a percussionist and actor.

Family background 

Ratul Shankar is the great-grandson of Shyam Shankar Chowdhury, grandson of Uday Shankar, grand nephew of renowned sitarist Ravi Shankar, son of Mamata Shankar and nephew of Ananda Shankar sitar player Anoushka Shankar and western singer Norah Jones.

Born in the Shankar family on 30 July 1979, Ratul was exposed to the various forms of performing arts at a very young age. He has been touring with his illustrious parents Mamata Shankar and Chandrodoy Ghosh from the age of 2 years.

Trained under Pt. Tanmoy Bose, Ratul also has had the honour of performing in his World Music Project "TAAL TANTRA" and has been performing with the project for the last 13 years. He has also been a feature of various other World Music projects.

A Major in Mass Communication and Videography from St. Xavier's College, Kolkata, Shankar made his debut in acting with Rituporno Ghosh in the National Award winning film Utsab in 2000.

But music has always been his first love and shall always be, as he always says, his greatest influence has been his uncle Ananda Shankar. While performing with "TAAL TANTRA" and other various projects, Ratul has had the privilege to perform with the maestros namely Ustad Amjad Ali Khan, Ustad Taufique Quereshi, Selvaganesh, Pt. Tejendra Narayan Majumdar, Pt. Bickram Ghosh, Pete Lockett, Tilmann Dienhart, Niladri Kumar, Carl Peters, Ranajit Sengupta, Wolfgang Netzer, Soweto Kinch, Jesse Bannister, Attab Hadad and many more.

Shankar has been touring extensively with various projects scattered over the world. His main interest lies in collaborating with musicians from all over and believes in the Cultural Exchange that takes place fluently.

As an actor 

Ratul has acted in Anuranan and Rituparno Ghosh's Utsab

References

External links

1979 births
Living people
Bengali musicians
Male actors from Kolkata
Indian percussionists